Mohammed Rafique (born 26 March 1991), is an Indian footballer who plays as a midfielder for Chennaiyin in the Indian Super League.

Club career

Prayag United
After spending his youth years at Tollygunge Agragami, Rafique joined Prayag United in 2010 and would go on to play 6 senior games in his debut season, scoring once against Chirag United Kerala. Rafique played five games during the 2011-12 I-League season, his second at senior level for Prayag. Rafique established himself as a regular in the centre of midfield in his final two seasons at United SC.

East Bengal
Rafique signed for East Bengal in May 2014 on a two-year deal  and was loaned out to Atlético de Kolkata for the 2014 Indian Super League. Rafique scored the title winning goal in the 90th minute from a corner in the final.

Rafique returned to parent club East Bengal for the 2014-15 I-League season, making his debut for the team in the 2014-15 Federation Cup.

International career
Rafique made his debut for the India national football team against Laos on 2 June 2016 at the Asian Cup Qualifiers. He scored his first national team goal against Laos on 7 June 2016 in the 85th minute of the match.

Career statistics

Club

International

International goals
Scores and results list India's goal tally first

Honours

Prayag United
Durand Cup: 2010
IFA Shield: 2013

East Bengal
Calcutta Football League: 2014, 2015, 2016, 2017

Atlético de Kolkata
Indian Super League: 2014

India
 Intercontinental Cup: 2017, 2018

References

Indian footballers
1991 births
Living people
I-League players
United SC players
East Bengal Club players
India international footballers
Indian Super League players
ATK (football club) players
Association football midfielders
Footballers from Kolkata
Indian Muslims
21st-century Bengalis
Kerala Blasters FC players
Mumbai City FC players
Tollygunge Agragami FC players